Åmliavisa (The Åmli Gazette) is a local Norwegian weekly newspaper covering the municipality of Åmli in Aust-Agder county and neighboring areas. It was first published in March 2008. The newspaper was named Nynorsk User of the Year in 2008. Esben Holm Eskelund edited the paper from 2014 to 2015, and was succeeded by Camilla Glad in April 2015. It is issued every Tuesday. 

The newspaper is owned by the company ÅmliAvisa AS, which has 164 shareholders, including individuals, organizations, businesses, and the municipality.

Editors
 Inger Stavelin (2008–2010)
 Peter Svalheim (2010–2013)
 Esben Holm Eskelund (2014–2015)
 Camilla Glad (2015–)

Circulation
According to the Norwegian Audit Bureau of Circulations and the National Association of Local Newspapers, Åmliavisa has had the following annual circulation:
2008: 1,281
2009: 1,521
2010: 1,517
2011: 1,415
2012: 1,416
2013: 1,363
2014: 1,264
2015: 1,229
2016: 1,215

References

External links
Åmliavisa home page

2008 establishments in Norway
Åmli
Mass media in Aust-Agder
Newspapers established in 2008
Norwegian-language newspapers
Weekly newspapers published in Norway